Mutiny Ahead is a 1935 American adventure film directed by Thomas Atkins and starring Neil Hamilton, Kathleen Burke and Leon Ames.

Main cast
 Neil Hamilton Kent Brewster  
 Kathleen Burke as Carol Bixby  
 Leon Ames as  McMurtrie  
 Reginald Barlow as Captain Martin  
 Noel Francis as Mimi  
 Paul Fix as Teeter Smith  
 Dick Curtis as Stevens  
 Ray Turner as Sassafras  
 Katherine Jackson as Glory Bell  
 Maidel Turner as Kitty Vanderpool  
 Roger Moore as Darby 
 Edward Earle as Barnes  
 Boothe Howard as Dudley - Casino Proprietor  
 Matthew Betz as Dixon

References

Bibliography
 Pitts, Michael R. Poverty Row Studios, 1929–1940: An Illustrated History of 55 Independent Film Companies, with a Filmography for Each. McFarland & Company, 2005.

External links
 

1935 films
1935 adventure films
American adventure films
Majestic Pictures films
Films scored by Lee Zahler
American black-and-white films
1930s English-language films
1930s American films
English-language adventure films